Magdi Saad (1954 – 2011) was an Egyptian professional squash player.

Born in 1954 he moved to Germany and lived in Hamburg. He competed several times as a top sixteen seeded player in the British Open Squash Championships. 
Saad represented Egypt at the 1979, 1981, 1983 & 1985 World Team Squash Championships.

References

External links
 

Egyptian male squash players
1954 births
2011 deaths
20th-century Egyptian people